Baker Sanatorium is a historic sanatorium in Lumberton, Robeson County, North Carolina.  It was built in 1920–1921, and is a -story, five bay, "T"-shaped Mission Revival style brick building.  The building features an arcaded porch, and the roofs are sheathed in terra cotta mission tiles.  The hospital continued in operation until 1993. It has been converted to apartments.

It was added to the National Register of Historic Places in 1998.

References

Hospitals in North Carolina
Hospital buildings on the National Register of Historic Places in North Carolina
Mission Revival architecture in North Carolina
Buildings and structures completed in 1921
Buildings and structures in Robeson County, North Carolina
National Register of Historic Places in Robeson County, North Carolina